State Route 152 (SR 152) is a state highway that runs from east to west near the middle of the U.S. state of California from State Route 1 in Watsonville to State Route 99 southeast of Merced. Its western portion (which is also known as Pacheco Pass Road and Pacheco Pass Highway) provides access to and from Interstate 5 toward Southern California for motorists in or near Gilroy and San Jose.

Route description

Route 152 begins near Route 1 as a series of local streets that run through downtown Watsonville: East Lake Avenue carries it to the intersection of Casserly Road. This point marks the start of a winding two-lane highway that crosses the Santa Cruz Mountains through Hecker Pass to reach Gilroy. In Gilroy, it is again carried on a series of local streets, then overlapped onto U.S. Route 101 for a small stretch before it separates again a short distance to the south and returns to heading east/west on more local streets in Gilroy.

After exiting the large commercial developments near U.S. 101, Route 152 consists of a single lane in each direction, with narrow shoulders, rain ditches on either side of the road, no center dividers, and posted speed limit of 55 mph (89 km/h), making it prone to head-on collisions. Headlights are required at all times along this portion. This segment is a significant bottleneck for traffic traveling along Route 152 between the San Francisco Bay area and the Central Valley. Upon reaching Route 156 near Hollister, the road expands to two lanes in each direction, and climbs and curves along the valley of Pacheco Creek into the mountains of the Diablo Range, crossing them through the Pacheco Pass into the San Joaquin Valley. 

SR 152 is one of the three major routes that cross the Diablo Range after Interstate 580 and State Route 46. Pacheco Pass is higher than Altamont Pass to the north, but lower than Polonio Pass to the south. 

Route 152 continues as a four-lane divided expressway, descending along the northern and eastern shore of the massive San Luis Reservoir. The route passes in between the San Luis Dam and the O'Neill Forebay. The route continues east and passes a large Path 15 substation and then meets Interstate 5 as an expressway. It becomes a speed-limited city street, Pacheco Blvd., while passing through Los Banos. It then returns to an expressway until its eastern terminus at Route 99. Here, eastbound 152 traffic merges into southbound 99 a few miles northwest of the city of Madera, and approximately 25 miles (40 km) northwest of Fresno. Motorists wishing to travel north on Route 99 are advised to take Route 233 north through Chowchilla to connect to northbound 99. Another possible northbound route exists by exiting Route 152 at State Route 59, and proceeding directly north to the city of Merced, where Route 59 meets Route 99.

The landmarks located on Route 152 include the Pacheco Pass, the Gilroy Gardens, the San Luis Reservoir, the Casa de Fruta and the Merry Cherries.

SR 152 is part of the California Freeway and Expressway System, and east of US 101 is part of the National Highway System, a network of highways that are considered essential to the country's economy, defense, and mobility by the Federal Highway Administration. SR 152 is eligible for the State Scenic Highway System, and from the Merced–Santa Clara county line to I-5 is officially designated as a scenic highway by the California Department of Transportation, meaning that it is a substantial section of highway passing through a "memorable landscape" with no "visual intrusions", where the potential designation has gained popular favor with the community.

History

The road became popular as a route east during the California Gold Rush. The Butterfield Overland Mail ran along this route from 1858 to 1861. A portion of Route 152 from Bell Station to Pacheco Pass was a toll road from 1857 until 1878. In that year, Merced County and Santa Clara County purchased the toll road and replaced it with a new road built as a public highway, part of which is now a segment of Whiskey Flat Trail in Pacheco State Park. In 1915, the road became part of the state highway system, and in 1923, the state completed the third road through the pass. Historic references say the portion of the route west of SR33 was named Legislative Route 32 before being designated State Route 152.

The 1923 state route over the pass had numerous curves and steep grades. In 1934, 3.3 miles of the road eastward from the summit was realigned and widened. In 1939, a realignment of 2.6 miles of highway was completed eastward from the Pacheco Reservoir area (starting about a mile east of Bell Station). In 1950, the first four-lane expressway segment was constructed from the 1939 alignment to near the Merced County line, a distance of 3.26 miles. The 1934 alignment is now Dinosaur Point Road, while the 1939 and 1950 alignments continue to be in use today as part of SR 152.

In 1963-65, a new 12-mile four-lane expressway, with climbing lanes for trucks, was built from the Merced County line eastward, to bypass the San Luis Reservoir which was then under construction. A three-mile stretch of the bypassed road continues to be in use as Dinosaur Point Road, providing access to a boat launch ramp at the reservoir.

Between 1982 and 1992, the road was widened in two phases from two to four lanes, with some realignments, on a 10.5-mile segment from the four-lane section completed in 1950 to just east of the junction with California State Route 156. The first phase, from the 1950 segment west to Bell Station, was completed in 1984. The second phase, from Bell Station to Route 156, was constructed from 1990 to 1992, with an interchange built at Casa de Fruta. In 2008, a T-junction and stop sign at the intersection with Route 156 on the remaining two-lane section of the highway west of Casa de Fruta was replaced with a flyover, greatly easing congestion there.

A segment of Route 152 west of Gilroy, between the Uvas Creek Bridge and Santa Teresa Blvd, was added to the National Register of Historic Places in 2007. This segment of the road, serving as a western gateway into Gilroy, is lined with deodar cedar trees that were planted on consecutive Arbor Days in 1930 and 1931.

Major intersections

See also

References

External links

Caltrans: Route 152 road conditions
California Highways: SR 152
California @ AARoads.com - State Route 152

152
152
State Route 152
State Route 152
State Route 152
State Route 152
Los Banos, California
Butterfield Overland Mail in California
History of the American West
Roads on the National Register of Historic Places in California
National Register of Historic Places in Santa Clara County, California